Jim Todd (born 1952 in Billerica, Massachusetts) is a professional basketball coach who last served as an assistant for the New York Knicks.

NBA coaching career

Los Angeles Clippers
He was the coach at Salem State College for nearly ten years, and coached the Los Angeles Clippers for half a season in 2000, replacing Chris Ford.  His focus was power forwards and centers.  He was well known for his "Big Man" basketball camp dedicated to the development of post players.

Toronto Raptors & Milwaukee Bucks
Todd left the Toronto Raptors for the Milwaukee Bucks on June 13, 2007.

Atlanta Hawks
Todd joined the Atlanta Hawks coaching staff on July 16, 2008, where he was an assistant for two seasons.

Sacramento Kings
Todd joined the Sacramento Kings coaching staff as an assistant, on December 7, 2011.

New York Knicks
Todd joined the New York Knicks coaching staff as an assistant, on March 17, 2012.

Todd was fired with the rest of the Knicks staff on April 21, 2014.

Personal life
Todd and his wife Gail, retired, reside in Westford, Massachusetts.

References

External links
 BasketballReference.com: Jim Todd
 NBA.com coach file: Jim Todd

1952 births
Living people
American expatriate basketball people in Canada
American expatriate basketball people in China
American men's basketball coaches
American men's basketball players
Basketball coaches from Massachusetts
Basketball players from Massachusetts
College men's basketball head coaches in the United States
College men's basketball players in the United States
Columbia Lions men's basketball coaches
DePaul Blue Demons men's basketball coaches
Fitchburg State Falcons men's basketball coaches
Fitchburg State University alumni
High school basketball coaches in the United States
Los Angeles Clippers head coaches
Marist Red Foxes men's basketball coaches
Milwaukee Bucks assistant coaches
New York Knicks assistant coaches
People from Westford, Massachusetts
Sacramento Kings assistant coaches
Salem State Vikings men's basketball coaches
Sportspeople from Middlesex County, Massachusetts
Toronto Raptors assistant coaches